Nickel Plate Road 587 is a 2-8-2 type USRA Light Mikado steam locomotive built in September 1918 by the Baldwin Locomotive Works for the Lake Erie and Western Railroad as its No. 5541. In 1923, the LE&W was merged into the New York, Chicago and St. Louis Railroad, commonly referred to as the "Nickel Plate Road", and allocated 587 as its new number in 1924. In 2003, the locomotive was being restored by the Indiana Transportation Museum in Noblesville, Indiana. However in 2018, the museum was being moved to Logansport, Indiana, forcing No. 587 to be stored in Ravenna, Kentucky by the Kentucky Steam Heritage Corp. Since its arrival in Kentucky NKP 587 has been sold by Indiana Transportation Museum to a private individual who will remain anonymous until more information is released at a later point. There are plans to continue the locomotive restoration, but if and when that will happen is unknown.  It was listed on the National Register of Historic Places in 1984, but was delisted on November 15, 2021.

History

Revenue service
No. 587 was originally built for the Lake Erie & Western Railroad (LE&W) in
September 1918 and originally numbered as 5541. When LE&W was bought by Nickel Plate Road in 1922 the NKP spent the next 2 years consolidating and standardizing the locomotive number system. In 1924, LE&W 5541 was renumbered as NKP 587. Its cylinders were replaced with Lima Locomotive Works (LLW) castings during its late 1943 overhaul.

NKP No. 587 served on the NKP railroad for 37 years on the route from Indianapolis to Michigan City. The locomotive remained relatively unchanged from its original design  when it pull its final revenue train in  March 1955 and was retired from revenue service.

Retirement
On September 9, 1955, NKP 587 was donated to the city of Indianapolis and put on display in Broad Ripple Park, Indianapolis, Indiana. Prior to being put on display, the locomotive's original tender was switched with another NKP steam engine No. 639, because the tender on 639 was in need of repair and 587's original tender was in good mechanical condition. No. 587 was originally equipped with the 16-ton, 10,000 gallon tender used behind USRA 2-8-2s, but in the 1930s, it received a larger 16RA tender that carries 20 tons of coal and 20,000 gallons of water.

In 1934, Lima Locomotive Works delivered 25 22RA tenders to the NKP for Mikados. These tenders were nearly identical to those behind the Berkshires (2-8-4) built by Lima.

In 1955, another Mikado, No. 639 was shopped with a 22RA tender on which the stoker was inoperable, and the railroad switched tenders to keep the No. 639 running. No. 587 was displayed in Indianapolis's Broad Ripple Park with the larger 22RA tender in 1955. No. 639 was retired in 1957 and displayed in Bloomington, Illinois with No. 587's 16RA tender.

NKP No. 587 remained in Broad Ripple Park until October 1983. At that time the city of Indianapolis was interested in building a new public library in the park, but the only available location was where the 587 was displayed.

Restoration
A group of people called "Friends of 587" did a feasibility study and determined that the locomotive was a good project for restoration. The locomotive was then leased by the Indianapolis Parks Department to the Indiana Transportation Museum (ITM). After restoration was completed, the engine made a successful test run on August 29, 1988.

From October of 1983 to September 1988, the ITM leased a work area at Amtrak's Beech Grove Shops. During restoration, the museum was surprised to find that when the welds holding the fire box doors closed (for safety purposes) were removed there were still ashes in the ashpan. This indicated that the locomotive was simply pulled from active service and stored until being donated to the city of Indianapolis.

Restoration consumed many thousands of volunteer hours and nearly $250,000 in donated money and materials. NKP No. 587 made its first excursion run on September 17, 1988 by pulling an excursion train from Indianapolis to Logansport, Indiana.

Excursion service

No. 587 was operated by the Indiana Transportation Museum and was considered its crown jewel. It was used primarily to pull the museum's fair train from Fishers, IN to the Indiana State Fair in Indianapolis, IN and other special events.

In 1989, No. 587 teamed up with N&W 611 to pull the annual Independence Limited from Rocky River, Ohio to Roanoke, Virginia over a 4 day period from June 17-20, with 587 being added at Bellevue, Ohio. On July 16th of 1989, 587 joined 611 and Norfolk and Western 1218 to led a tripleheader from Roanoke to Lynchburg, Virginia for the National Railway Historical Society convention held in Asheville, North Carolina. The 587 led two excursions for the Convention, one of them with 1218. In October 1988-89 and 1993, The 587 made runs down to Bloomington, Indiana along with a side trip over Tulip Trestle, 20 miles west of Bloomington. 

In 1993, No. 587 led with NKP 765 on an excursion between Fort Wayne and Chicago as well as another doubleheader with 765 as part of the National Railway Historical Society convention. In 1997, with the engine needing repairs, No. 587 along with a tool car in tow, deadheaded to the Monticello Railway Museum to receive the necessary repairs. With the repair work to the wheels completed, No. 587 made a few runs to benefit the restoration of Southern Railway 401. On November 11, 2002 with 587's Federal Railroad Administration mandated rebuild approaching in a few months, 587 made its final runs at the Indiana Transportation Museum. An all day excursion over the museum's entire 38 mile line from Tipton, Indiana to Indianapolis, Indiana. In early 2003, No. 587's operating permit expired. This is due to Federal Railroad Administration's requirements to have all of the boiler tubes and flues from the steam locomotives to be replaced every 15 years, or 1,472 days of operation.

Downtime

No. 587 is undergoing its second overhaul dependent on funding and available volunteer efforts. The tubes, flues, dry pipe, super-heater and many other pieces have been removed. The dry pipe was worn too thin to support the steam pressures necessary to operate the locomotive. A new dry pipe has been formed and is awaiting installation into the boiler. The air pump has been removed and rebuilt and is in storage awaiting re-installation. Several sections of the firebox have been cut away and replaced as well as a section of the rear tube sheet that was worn too thin to support the operating steam pressure. A new tube sheet section has been cut and using the heat and beat method has been molded into place. It is now in the contractor's shop to have the new holes drilled in it. New tubes have been swaged, which is a process of reducing the diameter on one end while not cutting away any material. They have been transported to the museum in Noblesville and are currently stored until they are needed. Riveting of the firebox is nearly complete with only the front section and several rivets in the corners needing to be replaced. This will require the rear driver of 587 to be dropped into a shallow pit to allow for the riveting to take place.

The locomotive was inside the Indiana Transportation Museum's shop undergoing additional work. It was lifted several inches off its supporting trucks and running gear to allow access to the leaf springs and bushings without the need to drop all the drivers. The bushings will be removed and replaced as most have worn thin from years of use.

In 2008, the ownership of No. 587 was officially transferred from the Indianapolis Parks Department to the Indiana Transportation Museum.

Stored in Kentucky
On June 28, 2018, a court order required Indiana Transportation Museum to vacate its former location. The Kentucky Steam Heritage Corporation made a deal with the museum to relocate 587 before the deadline. Plans are for the locomotive to be moved to Ravenna, Kentucky and have it stored alongside Chesapeake & Ohio No. 2716 until the Indiana Transportation Museum can raise enough funds for restoration, and they wanted to eventually return the locomotive back to Indiana once the restoration is complete. On July 7, most of the main components of the 587 left museum's grounds, except for the tender body, which left the grounds on July 12 and was fully unloaded on July 14. On March 5, 2021, the ownership of No. 587 was transferred from the Indiana Transportation Museum to a private individual who is working with the Kentucky Steam Heritage Corporation regarding the future of the locomotive. No. 587 will be remaining in Ravenna until a solid plan can be attained.

In popular culture 
In 2000, No. 587 was selected as the starring locomotive to appear in the children's movie Old 587: The Great Train Robbery. In the film, a group of kids find the locomotive in a scrapyard. With the help of the locomotive's old engineer, they rescue the 587 from being cut up for scrap and donate it to a museum.

See also
Canadian National 3254
Grand Trunk Western 4070
Grand Canyon Railway 4960
Soo Line 1003
Southern Railway 4501

References

587
Baldwin locomotives
2-8-2 locomotives
Individual locomotives of the United States
Railway locomotives introduced in 1918
Railway locomotives on the National Register of Historic Places
National Register of Historic Places in Hamilton County, Indiana
Standard gauge locomotives of the United States
Rail transportation on the National Register of Historic Places in Indiana
Preserved steam locomotives of Kentucky
Former National Register of Historic Places in Indiana
Transportation in Hamilton County, Indiana
Transportation in Estill County, Kentucky